is a 2003 Japanese film directed by Yūzō Asahara.

Cast
 Toshiyuki Nishida
 Rentaro Mikuni
 Jun Kunimura
 Kunihiro Matsumura
 Kei Tani

Awards
46th Blue Ribbon Award
Won: Best Actor - Toshiyuki Nishida

References

2003 films
Films directed by Yūzou Asahara
2000s Japanese-language films
Films scored by Taro Iwashiro
14
2000s Japanese films